The Gentleman's Will is a cultural heritage monument in Smrekonica, Vushtrri, Kosovo.

History
The wall is said to have been built by the local feudal lord in the 19th century. The village school and the lord's tower house originally stood nearby but have been lost. In the early 20th century, the Kajtazi family bought the property. Exterior stabilization by the family is the only renovation made so far.<

See also 
 Sanjak of Viçitrina
 List of monuments in Vushtrri

References

Historic sites in Kosovo
Cultural heritage monuments in Vushtrri
Buildings and structures in Vushtrri